Ashur-uballit I (Aššur-uballiṭ I), who reigned between  1363 and  1328 BC, was the first king of the Middle Assyrian Empire. After his father Eriba-Adad I had broken Mitanni influence over Assyria, Ashur-uballit I's defeat of the Mitanni king Shuttarna III marks Assyria's ascendancy over the Hurri-Mitanni Empire, and the beginning of its emergence as a powerful empire. Later on, due to disorder in Babylonia following the death of the Kassite king Burnaburiash II, Ashur-uballit established Kurigalzu II on the Babylonian throne, in the first of what would become a series of Assyrian interventions in Babylonian affairs.

Amarna letters 
From the Amarna letters, a series of diplomatic letters from various Middle Eastern monarchs to Amenhotep III and Akhenaten of Egypt, we find two letters from Ashur-uballit I, the second being a follow-up letter to the first.  In the letters, Ashur-uballit refers to his second predecessor Ashur-nadin-ahhe II as his "father" or "ancestor," rather than his actual father, Eriba-Adad I, which has led some critics of conventional Egyptian chronology, such as David Rohl, to claim that the Ashur-uballit of the Amarna letters was not the same as Ashur-uballit I.  This, however, ignores the fact that monarchs in the Amarna letters frequently refer to predecessors as their "father," even if they were not their biological sons.  In this case, Ashur-uballit presumably referred to Ashur-nadin-ahhe because the latter, unlike Eriba-Adad I, had previously corresponded with the Egyptian court.

Babylonian wars 

With Assyrian power firmly established, Ashur-uballit started to make contacts with other great nations. His messages to the Egyptians angered his Babylonian neighbour Burnaburiash II, who himself wrote to the Pharaoh: “with regard to my Assyrian vassals, it was not I who sent them to you. Why did they go to your country without proper authority? If you are loyal to me they will not negotiate any business. Send them to me empty-handed!” 

Yet the new Assyrian power could not be denied, and Burnaburiash even married the daughter of the Assyrian king. He was succeeded by his son from the Assyrian wife, prince Kara-hardash, but a revolt soon broke out that showed the unpopularity of the Assyrians. Asshur-uballit would not allow his grandson to be cast aside, and duly invaded Babylon. Because Kara-Hardash was killed in the rebellion, the Assyrians placed on the Babylonian throne a certain Kurigalzu, who may have been Burnaburiash's son or grandson. But this new puppet king did not remain loyal to his master, and soon invaded Assyria. Ashur-uballit stopped the Babylonian army at Sugagu, not far south from the capital Assur.

Ashur-uballit I then counterattacked, and invaded Babylonia, appropriating hitherto Babylonian territory in central Mesopotamia, and forcing a treaty in Assyria's favour upon Karigalzu.

See also
 Amarna letter EA 15

References

External links
2 Letters by Assur-uballit I to Pharaoh, EA 15, EA 16.

14th-century BC Assyrian kings
Amarna letters writers
Year of birth unknown
Kings of the Universe